"Bla bla bla" is a song by French singer Priscilla from her debut album Cette vie nouvelle. The song was released as a single that came out simultaneously with the album in June 2002.

Track listing

Charts

References 

2002 songs
2002 singles
Priscilla Betti songs
Jive Records singles
Songs written by Steve Mac
Songs written by Jörgen Elofsson